Time's Up is the second studio album by the band Living Colour, released on August 28, 1990 through Epic Records. It was the follow-up to their successful 1988 album Vivid. Time's Up features a wide range of genres and also includes cameo appearances by Queen Latifah, Little Richard, Doug E. Fresh, Maceo Parker and James Earl Jones. The album reached gold status, peaking at #13 on the Billboard 200, and won a Grammy for Best Hard Rock Performance. It is the final album to feature Muzz Skillings on bass, though it was not his last release with the band (as he appeared on the Biscuits EP). In late February 2014, the album was reissued in Europe by Music On CD and is available once again.

Music

Time's Up has been described as a hard rock, heavy metal, and funk metal album, with elements of hip hop, jazz, funk, jazz fusion, Delta blues, soul,  punk rock, and art rock.

Critical reception

In The Village Voices annual Pazz & Jop critics' poll for the year's best albums, Time's Up finished at number five.

Accolades
Grammy Awards

Track listing

Banded version
A special US advance promo version omitting "History Lesson", "Ology1" and "Tag Team Partners". Along with the CD, it was also pressed on transparent gold vinyl. Catalog number ESK 2171

Personnel

Living Colour
 Corey Glover – vocals, rhythm guitar on "Type"
 Vernon Reid – lead guitar
 Muzz Skillings – bass
 Will Calhoun – drums
Guest musicians
 Akbar Ali - strings
 Charles Burnham - strings
 Don Byron - clarinet, baritone saxophone
 Annette Daniels - background vocals
 D.K. Dyson - background vocals
 Eileen Folson - strings
 Doug E. Fresh - percussion, vocals
 Mick Jagger - background vocals
 Toshinobu Kubota - background vocals
 Little Richard - vocals
 Yubie Navas - background vocals
 Maceo Parker - saxophone
 Queen Latifah - vocals
 Alva Rogers - background vocals
 Rosa Russ - background vocals
 Francine Stasium - background vocals
 Reggie Workman - strings
 Derin Young - vocals, background vocals

Technical Personnel
 John Aguto - assistant engineer
 Greg Calbi - mastering
 Alan Friedman - programming
 Lolly Grodner - assistant engineer
 Paul Hamingson - engineer, assistant engineer
 Jeff Lippay - assistant engineer
 Ed Stasium - producer, engineer, mixing
 Lex Van Pieterson - photography

Charts

References

1990 albums
Albums produced by Ed Stasium
Epic Records albums
Funk metal albums
Grammy Award for Best Hard Rock Performance
Living Colour albums